Slovenia participated in the Eurovision Song Contest 2012 with the song "Verjamem" written by Vladimir Graić, Hari Mata Hari and Igor Pirkovič. The song was performed by Eva Boto. Slovenian broadcaster Radiotelevizija Slovenija (RTV Slovenija) organised the national final Misija EMA 2012 in order to select the Slovenian entry for the 2012 contest in Baku, Azerbaijan. Two finalists selected through the talent selection Misija Evrovizija competed in the national final where the winner was selected over two rounds of voting. In the first round, each finalist performed three songs and the top two entries were selected by a four-member jury panel and a public vote. In the second round, "Verjamem" performed by Eva Boto was selected as the winner entirely by a public vote.

Slovenia was drawn to compete in the second semi-final of the Eurovision Song Contest which took place on 24 May 2012. Performing during the show in position 9, "Verjamem" was not announced among the top 10 entries of the second semi-final and therefore did not qualify to compete in the final. It was later revealed that Slovenia placed seventeenth out of the 18 participating countries in the semi-final with 31 points.

Background 

Slovenia's highest placing in the contest, to this point, has been seventh place, which the nation achieved on two occasions: in 1995 with the song "Prisluhni mi" performed by Darja Švajger and in 2001 with the song "Energy" performed by Nuša Derenda. The country's only other top ten result was achieved in 1997 when Tanja Ribič performing "Zbudi se" placed tenth. Since the introduction of semi-finals to the format of the contest in 2004, Slovenia had thus far only managed to qualify to the final on two occasions. In 2011, "No One" performed by Maja Keuc qualified to the final and placed thirteenth.

The Slovenian national broadcaster, Radiotelevizija Slovenija (RTV Slovenija), broadcasts the event within Slovenia and organises the selection process for the nation's entry. RTV Slovenija confirmed Slovenia's participation in the 2012 Eurovision Song Contest on 24 June 2011. The Slovenian entry for the Eurovision Song Contest has traditionally been selected through a national final entitled Evrovizijska Melodija (EMA), which has been produced with variable formats. For 2012, the broadcaster opted to organise EMA 2012 to select the Slovenian entry, which would consist of two phases.

Before Eurovision

Misija Evrovizija
Misija Evrovizija was the first phase of the Slovenian national final used by RTV Slovenija to select Slovenia's entry for the Eurovision Song Contest 2012. The competition involved a three-month-long process that commenced on 2 October 2011 and concluded on 8 January 2012 with two finalists that would proceed to Misija EMA 2012. The competition took place at the RTV Slovenija studios in Ljubljana, hosted by Klemen Slakonja and 2011 Slovenian Eurovision entrant Maja Keuc, and was broadcast on TV SLO1 and online via the broadcaster's website rtvslo.si.

Judges 
During the live shows, a four-member judging panel was responsible for selecting contestants to advance as well as to select those who would be exempt for elimination. The judging panel consisted of:
Darja Švajger – Singer, vocal coach and 1995 and 1999 Slovenian Eurovision entrant
Jonas Žnidaršič – Television personality
Raay – Singer-songwriter
Tina Marinšek – Singer

Auditions 
Artists aged over 16 were able to attend the producers' auditions that took place between 26 August 2011 and 30 August 2011 in five cities across Slovenia: Celje, Novo Mesto, Koper, Maribor and Ljubljana. The competition producers selected 130 contestants for the judges' auditions from the auditioning acts. During the judges' auditions, the contestants performed in front of a three-member judging panel and thirty-two were selected to compete in the live shows.

Results summary 
Colour key
  – Contestant was eliminated
  – Contestant was in the bottom two

Round 1 
The 32 contestants competed in the first round of Misija Evrovizija over four shows, with 8 contestants in each. 4 contestants from each advanced in the competition as two were saved by the public vote and the other two were saved by the judges.

Round 2 
The remaining 16 contestants competed in the second round of Misija Evrovizija over two shows, with 8 contestants in each. 4 contestants advanced in the competition as two were saved by the public vote and the other two were saved by the judges.

Round 3 
The remaining 8 contestants competed in the third round of Misija Evrovizija over four elimination shows. The judges selected 2 contestants up for eviction, with one being saved by the public vote. Due to the Slovenian parliamentary election on 4 December 2011, the tenth show was postponed to 11 December 2011.

Semi-final 
The remaining four contestants competed in the semi-final of Misija Evrovizija. A public vote selected two contestants up for eviction, with one being saved by the judges.

Final 
The remaining three contestants competed in the final of Misija Evrovizija. Two were selected to compete in Misija EMA 2012. A public vote selected the first finalist and the judges selected the other finalist.

Misija 2012
Misija 2012 aired on 31 December 2011 for the New Year of Misija Evrovizija. The top eight contestants of Misija Evrovizija and former EMA contestants performed during the show.

Misija EMA 2012 
Misija EMA 2012 was the 17th edition of the Slovenian national final format Evrovizijska Melodija (EMA). The competition was used by RTV Slovenija as the second phase of the Slovenian national final to select their entry for the Eurovision Song Contest 2012. The competition was broadcast on TV SLO1 and online via the broadcaster's website rtvslo.si and the official Eurovision Song Contest website eurovision.tv.

Format 
Three songs performed by each of the two Misija Evrovizija finalists, Eva Boto and Eva and Nika Prusnik, competed in a televised show where the winner was selected over two rounds of voting. In the first round, the points from a three-member expert jury and public televoting selected one finalist out of the three competing songs per artist to proceed to a superfinal. Both the expert jury and the televote awarded 1, 3 and 5 points to their top three songs performed by each artist with the top two being determined by the songs that receive the highest scores when the jury and public votes are combined. Ties were broken by giving priority to the song that achieved a higher number of scores from the jury. In the superfinal, public televoting exclusively determined the winner. In case of technical problems with the televote, the jury would have voted to determine the winner in a similar process as in the first round of the competition.

Competing entries 
52 songs were received by the broadcaster from composers during a submission period. An expert committee consisting of Darja Švajger, Mojca Menart (head of the Publishing House of RTV Slovenija) and Aleksander Radić (Head of the Slovenian delegation at the Eurovision Song Contest) selected three songs for the competition from the received submissions, while an additional three songs were written by composers invited by RTV Slovenija for the competition. Eva Boto and Eva and Nika Prusnik were then allocated three competing songs each, which were announced on 16 February 2012.

Final 
Misija EMA 2012 took place on 26 February 2012 at the RTV Slovenija studios in Ljubljana, hosted by Klemen Slakonja and Maja Keuc. In addition to the performances of the competing entries, Maja Keuc, 2012 French Eurovision entrant Anggun and member of 1989 Eurovision winners Riva Emilija Kokić performed as guests. The winner was selected over two rounds of voting. In the first round, a combination of points from a four-member jury panel and a public vote selected one song per artist to proceed to the second round. The jury consisted of the Misija Evrovizija judges Darja Švajger, Jonas Žnidaršič, Raay and Tina Marinšek. In the second round, a public vote selected "Verjamem" performed by Eva Boto as the winner.

At Eurovision
According to Eurovision rules, all nations with the exceptions of the host country and the "Big Five" (France, Germany, Italy, Spain and the United Kingdom) are required to qualify from one of two semi-finals in order to compete for the final; the top ten countries from each semi-final progress to the final. The European Broadcasting Union (EBU) split up the competing countries into six different pots based on voting patterns from previous contests, with countries with favourable voting histories put into the same pot. On 25 January 2012, a special allocation draw was held which placed each country into one of the two semi-finals. Slovenia was placed into the second semi-final, to be held on 24 May 2012. The running order for the semi-finals was decided through another draw on 20 March 2012 and Slovenia was set to perform in position 9, following the entry from Bulgaria and before the entry from Croatia.

In Slovenia, the semi-finals were televised on RTV SLO2 and the final was televised on RTV SLO1 with commentary by Andrej Hofer. The Slovenian spokesperson, who announced the Slovenian votes during the final, was Lorella Flego.

Semi-final 

Eva Boto took in technical rehearsals on 16 and 19 May, followed by dress rehearsals on 23 and 24 May. This included the jury show on 23 May where the professional juries of each country watched and voted on the competing entries.

The Slovenian performance featured Eva Boto performing in a long white dress attached with a flower decoration together with five backing vocalists who also wore long white dresses. The stage colours transitioned from blue to gold as the song progressed, and the LED screens displayed blue waving cloth which changed to golden bubbles in the middle of the performance. The Slovenian performance was choreographed by Matic Zadravec from the Maestro Dance Studio. The five backing vocalists that joined Eva Boto on stage were: Ana Bezjak, Katja Koren, Martina Majerle, Mateja Majerle and Sandra Feketija. Majerle previously represented Slovenia in the Eurovision Song Contest 2009 together with the group Quartissimo where they failed to qualify to the grand final of the contest with the song "Love Symphony".

Despite being one of the bookmakers favourites, at the end of the show, Slovenia was not announced among the top 10 entries in the second semi-final and therefore failed to qualify to compete in the final. It was later revealed that Slovenia placed seventeenth in the semi-final, receiving a total of 31 points.

Voting 
Voting during the three shows involved each country awarding points from 1-8, 10 and 12 as determined by a combination of 50% national jury and 50% televoting. Each nation's jury consisted of five music industry professionals who are citizens of the country they represent. This jury judged each entry based on: vocal capacity; the stage performance; the song's composition and originality; and the overall impression by the act. In addition, no member of a national jury was permitted to be related in any way to any of the competing acts in such a way that they cannot vote impartially and independently.

Below is a breakdown of points awarded to Slovenia and awarded by Slovenia in the second semi-final and grand final of the contest. The nation awarded its 12 points to Serbia in the semi-final and the final of the contest.

Points awarded to Slovenia

Points awarded by Slovenia

Jury Points awarded by Slovenia

References

External links
 official site RTV SLO

2012
Countries in the Eurovision Song Contest 2012
Eurovision